Aching Hearts is a 2009 Danish drama film directed by Nils Malmros.

References

External links 

2009 drama films
2009 films
Danish drama films
2000s Danish-language films